The absolute currency strength (ACS) is a technical indicator used in the technical analysis of foreign exchange markets.

It is intended to chart the current and historical gain or loss of a currency based on the closing prices of a recent trading period. It is based on mathematical decorrelation of 28 cross currency pairs. It shows absolute strength momentum of selected major currency (EUR, GBP, AUD, USD, CAD, CHF, JPY).

The ACS is typically used on a 15*period timeframe, calculated as a percentage gain or loss. This indicator is not measured on a scale like relative currency strength.
Shorter or longer timeframes are used for alternately shorter or longer outlooks. Extreme high and low percentage values occur less frequently but indicate stronger momentum of currency.

ACS is in most cases used as support indicator for relative currency strength indicator. But it can be used by itself for currency trading. One can use absolute currency strength for pattern trading as well. Combination of RCS and ACS indicators gives entry and exit signals for currency trading.

Basic idea
Indicator basic idea is "buy strong currency and sell weak currency". If is X/Y currency pair in uptrend, it shows if it is due to X strength or Y weakness. On this signal one can choose the most worthy pair to trade.

Advantages for trading strategies
Absolute currency strength can be used as a support indicator for technical analysis in combination with relative currency strength. It is an information indicator to realize which currencies are being demanded, this is an ideal indicator for trend follow traders.
It helps scalpers looking for strength trend (trader can see both absolute and relative strength).
It is an instrument for correlation/spread traders to see reactions of each currencies on moves in correlated instruments (for example CAD/OIL or AUD/GOLD).

See also
 Relative strength index

References

Technical indicators